David B. Adams, M.D. (born 1950) is Professor of Surgery, Chief, Division of Gastrointestinal and Laparoscopic Surgery and Co-Director of the Digestive Disease Center at the Medical University of South Carolina. Adams specializes in chronic pancreatitis surgeries. He has given over numerous presentations regarding his clinical interests and will host the Chronic Pancreatitis Symposium in 2014 on Kiawah Island.

Biography 
Adams was born in 1950 in Annapolis, Maryland at the U.S. Naval Academy.  A Navy junior, he was raised in Newport, Rhode Island, Arlington, Virginia, and Paris, France. Adams was named a Morehead Scholar at the University of North Carolina Chapel Hill in 1969.  He graduated Phi Beta Kappa from Chapel Hill in 1973 and then went on to attain his medical degree at the Medical College of Virginia in 1977.

After completing his internship and residency in surgery in 1982 at the U.S. Naval Hospital, Portsmouth, Virginia, he was named Chief of Surgery at the U.S. Naval Hospital, Guantanamo Bay, Cuba (where he was the only surgeon).  In 1983, he returned to the continental United States and was named Chief of Surgery at the U.S. Naval Hospital, Charleston, South Carolina. Three years later, he joined the faculty in the department of Surgery at the Medical University of South Carolina.

Appointments 
 President of the Waring Library Society
 President of the South Carolina Surgical Society
 President of the South Carolina Chapter of the American College of Surgeons
 Councilor of the Southeastern Surgical Society
 Governor of the American College of Surgeons
 Vice-President of the Halsted Society
 Second Vice-President of the Southern Surgical Association

Memberships 
 American College of Surgeons
 American Society for Gastrointestinal Endoscopy
 Society of American Gastrointestinal and Endoscopic Surgeons
 Southeastern Surgical Congress
 Pancreas Club
 Society for Surgery of the Alimentary Tract
 International Society for Digestive Surgery
 Surgical Biology Club III
 Societe Internationale de Chirurgie
 Southern Surgical Association
 American Hepato-Pancreato-Biliary Association
 International Association of Pancreatology
 Halsted Society
 American Surgical Association

Key papers

References

American surgeons
1950 births
Living people
People from Annapolis, Maryland
Medical College of Virginia alumni
Medical University of South Carolina faculty
University of North Carolina School of Medicine alumni
United States Navy Medical Corps officers